The 1928 Wightman Cup was the sixth edition of the annual women's team tennis competition between the United States and Great Britain. It was held at the All England Lawn Tennis and Croquet Club in London, England.

See also
 1928 Davis Cup

References

Wightman Cups by year
Wightman Cup, 1928
Wightman Cup
Wightman Cup
Wightman Cup
Wightman Cup